Next is a 2010 novel written by James Hynes. It won the 2010 Believer Book Award.

References

2010 American novels
Believer Book Award-winning books
Back Bay Books books